The East Village Eye was a cultural magazine, published by editor-in-chief Leonard Abrams, in circulation from May, 1979 until January, 1987. Based in the East Village section of New York City, the publication covered a range of locally focused topics, including art, politics and gentrification. The East Village Eye, colloquially referred to as The Eye, covered topics such as the emergence of punk rock, hip hop and fashion as fringe pop culture, as well as the burgeoning art and nightlife scenes that highlighted NYC's East Village neighborhood during the 1980s.

History
Leonard Abrams started the East Village Eye after moving to the East Village in the mid-1970s. Its first office was at 167 Ludlow Street, moving repeatedly in and around this relatively inexpensive pocket of downtown Manhattan. The magazine had a total of 72 issues.  

The Eye reached a peak circulation of 10,000 copies per month, available throughout New York City and outposts in San Francisco, Chicago, Los Angeles and Minneapolis. The magazine became a marketplace for the local economy, with neighborhood businesses purchasing ad space. Writers included Carlo McCormick and later Artnet writer and artist Walter Robinson.

The Eye claims to be the first publication to print and define the term "hip hop" in an interview between writer/subculturalist Michael Holman and Afrika Bambaataa.

References

External links
 East Village Eye archives

Defunct magazines published in the United States
Magazines published in New York City
Magazines established in 1979
Magazines disestablished in 1987
Cultural magazines published in the United States